Cheick Sallah Cissé (born 19 September 1993) is an Ivorian taekwondo athlete.

After winning gold at the 2015 African Games in the men's 80 kg, he represented Ivory Coast at the 2016 Summer Olympics in Rio de Janeiro in the same category. He reached the final of the tournament, competing against Britain's Lutalo Muhammad. Behind by six points to five, Cissé scored with a head-kick in the final second of the match to win the tie 8–6 and take the gold medal. The gold was Ivory Coast's first ever Olympic title, and came on a night where Ruth Gbagbi won a bronze in the women's 67 kg taekwondo, increasing the country's all-time Olympic medals from one to three in one session.

He also qualified for the 2020 Summer Olympics in the men's 80 kg event.

References

External links
 
 
 

1993 births
Living people
Ivorian male taekwondo practitioners
Olympic taekwondo practitioners of Ivory Coast
Taekwondo practitioners at the 2016 Summer Olympics
Medalists at the 2016 Summer Olympics
African Games gold medalists for Ivory Coast
African Games medalists in taekwondo
Olympic gold medalists for Ivory Coast
Universiade medalists in taekwondo
Competitors at the 2015 African Games
Universiade medalists for Ivory Coast
Competitors at the 2019 African Games
African Taekwondo Championships medalists
Medalists at the 2015 Summer Universiade
Taekwondo practitioners at the 2020 Summer Olympics
People from Bouaké
21st-century Ivorian people